The 2011 IAAF Diamond League (also known as the 2011 Samsung Diamond League for sponsorship purposes) was the second edition of the Diamond League, an annual series of fourteen one-day track and field meetings. The series began on 6 May in Doha, Qatar and ended on 16 September in Brussels, Belgium.

Meeting calendar

Ambassadors
A total of fourteen athletes were given Diamond League Ambassador status, with the intention of bringing attention to some of the sport's foremost competitors. There are seven male and seven female athletes, and the division between track and field specialists is also evenly divided.

Diamond Race winners
 Winners in blue defended their 2010 Diamond Race title

Results

Men

Track

 In Eugene, Oslo and London, mile races are counted to the Diamond League standings for the 1500 m.
 In Doha, 3000 metre race is counted to the Diamond League standings for the 5000 m.

Field

Women

Track

Field

References

Results
Results Archive. IAAF Diamond League (archived). Retrieved 2015-05-17.
Reviews
Rowbottom, Mike (2011-01-04). 2011 Samsung Diamond League REVIEW – Part 1. IAAF. Retrieved 2012-01-05.
Rowbottom, Mike (2011-01-05). 2011 Samsung Diamond League REVIEW – Part 2. IAAF. Retrieved 2012-01-05.

External links
Official website

Samsung Diamond League
Diamond League